Gaurav Chaudhary (born 7 May 1991), known professionally as Technical Guruji, is an Indian YouTube personality based in the UAE. Chaudhary is notable for producing YouTube videos concerning technology in Hindi. In 2020, he was on the Forbes India 30 under 30 list, and claimed to have 15 million subscribers on YouTube.

Early life 
Chaudhary was born in Ajmer, Rajasthan in a chaudhary family on 7 May 1990. He studied at a Kendriya Vidyalaya School. In 2012, he moved to Dubai to pursue a degree in microelectronics at BITS Pilani, Dubai Campus.

Career 
Chaudhary launched his YouTube channel "Technical Guruji" in October 2015, primarily posting advice and product reviews. His Senior from the school owning the YouTube channel Sharmaji Technical helped him in the making of the content.In 2017, Chaudhary created a second channel, "Gaurav Chaudhary" dedicated to producing content about his personal life.

In September 2018, Technical Guruji was ranked as the 9th most subscribed to technology YouTube channel. In November 2018, it was reported that Chaudhary was the first technology YouTuber to accrue more than 10 million subscribers.

Chaudhary has appeared in YouTube Rewind 2018 and 2019.

See also 
 MKBHD
 Unbox Therapy

References

External links
 
  

1991 births
Living people
Birla Institute of Technology and Science, Pilani alumni
Technology YouTubers
Technology blogs
People from Dubai
Indian Hindus
Indian expatriates in the United Arab Emirates
People from Ajmer
Indian YouTubers
YouTube channels launched in 2015